L'Oraille is a hamlet in the Manche département of northern France.

It is part of the commune of L'Étang-Bertrand.

See also
Communes of the Manche department

Villages in Normandy